Apluda is a genus of plants in the grass family native to Asia and to various islands in the Indian and Pacific Oceans.

The only known species is Apluda mutica, native to Central Asia, China (incl. Taiwan + Tibet), Japan (incl Ryukyu Islands), Indian Subcontinent, Southeast Asia, New Guinea, Vanuatu, Solomon Islands, New Caledonia, Caroline Islands, Madagascar, Mauritius, Réunion, Socotra, Oman.

Formerly included
see Andropogon, Ichnanthus, Ischaemum, Polytoca, Themeda, Zeugites

See also 
 List of Poaceae genera

References

External links 
 Grassbase - The World Online Grass Flora
 
 

Andropogoneae
Bunchgrasses of Asia
Bunchgrasses of Oceania
Poaceae genera
Monotypic Poaceae genera
Taxa named by Carl Linnaeus